Angel 'N' Devil (traditional Chinese: 終極惡女; simplified Chinese: 终极恶女; literally: "The Ultimate Bad Girls") is a 2014 Taiwanese drama starring Simon, Teddy, Cosmos, Lucia, Ting, Allie, Sunnee, Wes, and Wayne. It was produced by Comic International Productions (可米國際影視事業股份有限公司) and Gala Television, it was wrapped on December 19, 2014. It was first broadcast in Taiwan on cable network Gala Television (GTV) Variety Show/CH 28 (八大綜合台) on November 22, 2014, to February 15, 2015.

Synopsis 
A group of high school girls is Copper Dimension's last defense against the dark forces. They signed a contract with Xiong Ya, a guardian of light, to protect the innocent with their lives in exchange for having one wish come true. When one of their own is killed in school, their hunt for the devils in human skin brings them face to face with their own inner demon. They soon discover they are not above the influence of evil.

Cast 
Sylvia Wang as Yin Xiao Feng 
Simon Lian as Wang Charlie
Teddy Chen as Xiong Ya 
Cosmos Lin as Kate 
Lucia Chen as Yan Yan 
Liu Yuting as Xiang Ning 
Allie Ji as Allie 
Sunnee Yang as Ding Dang

Others
Cheng Yu Xi as Xiao Yang 
Luo Hong Zheng as Gou Zhui 
Huang Wei-jin as Wang Da Wei 
Chen De Xiu as Wei Yi 
Pets Tseng as Jie Ke 
Sam Lin as Xiang Ming 
Na Wei Xun as Ri Yin Wang 
Qin Yang as A Tian Wang 
Gong Ji An as Ji An
Chen Wei Min as Wu Yong 
Daniel Chang as Hao Meng 
Xiao Hou as Yan Rui 
Huang Niu as Hu Po
Zhang Zhe Hao as Wry neck assistant 
Wang Jian Min as killer 
Ba Yu as Zhang Mu Si 
Lin Yi Xun as Kai Da 
Cathy Shyu as He Jie 
Su Fei as Kate's mother 
Yan Zheng Lan as Lin Lin 
Yu Tai Yan as Yan Yan's mother
Li Quan Zhong as Yan Yan's father
Yang Zi Yi as Nightwalker 
Ying Wei-min as Daywalker 
He Ai Yun as Xiang Ning's mother 
Ariel Ann as Xiang Qing 
Jenny Wen as Xiao Mao 
Yin Shao De as Doctor Cheng 
Chien Te-men as Elderly pure daywalker
Xu Hao Xiang as Nightwalker 
Chen Bor-jeng as You Wang 
Aoi Anna as Wang An Na 
Aoi Reina as Wang Rui Na 
Eunice Liu as Tu Mi

Music

References 

Taiwanese drama television series
Gala Television original programming
2014 Taiwanese television series debuts
2015 Taiwanese television series endings
KO Series